Bayt 'Affa was a Palestinian village in the Gaza Subdistrict. It was depopulated and destroyed during the 1947–48 Civil War in Mandatory Palestine.

History
The village had a khirba which contained the remains of walls made of ancient columns, uncut stones and a well.

Ottoman era
Incorporated into the Ottoman Empire in 1517 with all of Palestine,  Bayt 'Affa  appeared   in the  1596 tax registers  as being in the Nahiya of  Gaza, part of  Gaza Sanjak. It had a population of 26 Muslim households, an estimated 143 inhabitants, who  paid taxes on wheat, barley, vine yards and fruit trees. 1/24 th of the revenue went to a waqf.

In 1838 Edward Robinson noted it as Beit 'Affa, a Muslim village in the Gaza district.

In 1863, Victor Guérin found it to be a village of 400 inhabitants, surrounded by tobacco and cucumber fields, while an   Ottoman  village list of about 1870 indicated 37 houses and a population of  90, though  the population count included men, only.

In 1883, the PEF's  Survey of Western Palestine described Bayt 'Affa as resembling Iraq Suwaydan; that is, a moderate-sized  adobe village situated on a plain. In addition, Bayt 'Affa was supplied with a  well.

British Mandate era
According to the 1922 census of Palestine conducted by the British Mandate authorities, Bayt 'Affa had a population of 422 Muslims, which had increased in  the 1931 census  to 462, still all Muslim.

In the 1945 statistics, there were 700 Muslims, with 5,808  dunams of land, according to an official land and population survey.  Of this, 14  dunams were used for plantations and irrigable land, 5,657 used for cereals, while 26  dunams were built-up land.

1948 and aftermath
The population probably left their homes following the capture of the village by the Israeli army around 9 July 1948. The Egyptian army drove the Israelis out a few days later and the village was not re-taken until Operation Yoav in the second half of October. The village was destroyed. Following the war the area was incorporated into the State of Israel.

In 1953 Yad Natan was established just south of the village site, on the land of Iraq Suwaydan.

In 1992 the village site was described: "There are no traces of village houses; only sycamore and carob trees and cactuses mark the site. Fruit trees, especially  citrus, are planted on the surrounding land and are irrigated from the Jordan River diversion canal."

References

Bibliography

 
  

  
  

  
 (pp.  256, 436, 437, 446, 456)

External links
Welcome To Bayt 'Affa
Survey of Western Palestine, Map 20:   IAA, Wikimedia commons
 Bayt 'Affa, Zochrot
Bayt 'Affa, from the Khalil Sakakini Cultural Center

Arab villages depopulated during the 1948 Arab–Israeli War
District of Gaza